Live Earth was an event developed to increase environmental awareness through entertainment.

Background
Founded by Emmy-winning producer Kevin Wall, in partnership with former U.S. Vice President Al Gore, Live Earth was built upon the belief that entertainment has the power to transcend social and cultural barriers to move the world community to action. Live Earth seeks to leverage the power of entertainment through integrated events, media, and the live experience to ignite a global movement aimed at solving the most critical environmental issues of our time.

Live Earth 2007

The 1st series of benefit concerts were held on 7 July 2007. The concerts brought together more than 150 musical acts in eleven locations around the world and were broadcast to a mass global audience through television, radio, and live internet streams.

Live Earth India 2008
The 2nd Live Earth concert was scheduled for 7 December 2008 at the Andheri Sports Complex on Veera Desai Road in  Andheri West, Mumbai, India and was managed by Kevin Wall who, after a request from former U. S. Vice President Al Gore, planned to have the entire event take place in India. In September 2008 Reuters stated that, "the December event will see U.S. rocker Jon Bon Jovi and Bollywood's biggest superstar, Amitabh Bachchan share the stage, and is described by organisers as one of the biggest events held in India." Shekhar Kapur, Nobel laureate Rajendra Pachauri,  Abhishek Bachchan, and Aishwarya Rai also planned to star in the event. Additional acts included Shankar–Ehsaan–Loy, Hrithik Roshan, Preity Zinta, Roger Waters of Pink Floyd, will.i.am, Hard Kaur, and Anoushka Shankar. Palash Sen stated that his band, Euphoria, was scheduled to launch a song written for the concert on the topic of global warming.

Live Earth would have been broadcast by STAR TV (Asia), which works in conjunction with the STAR Plus channel (United Kingdom, Middle East) and the Star World Channel. MSN was "the exclusive global broadband partner for Live Earth India."

The concert was cancelled shortly after the November 2008 Mumbai attacks on 26 November 2008. Wall, Gore, and Pachauri stated in a joint press release that, "due to circumstances far beyond our control, we are saddened to announce that Live Earth India has been cancelled. We will continue to work for solutions to the climate crisis for the good of the people of India and around the world. But for now, our thoughts and our prayers are with the victims of this terrible attack, with the bereaved, with the people of Mumbai and with everyone in India." Some argued against the cancellation stating that "music could have helped fear-hardened Mumbai to ride the storm." Jethro Tull and Anoushka Shankar, who also cancelled their 29 November Mumbai concert after  the November 2008 Mumbai attacks, reorganized the performance as A Billion Hands Concert,  a benefit performance for victims of the attacks, and held it in Mumbai on 5 December 2008.

Dow Live Earth Run for Water
The Dow Live Earth Run for Water took place 18 April 2010 and consisted of a series of 6 km run/walks (the average distance many women and children walk every day to secure water) taking place over the course of 24 hours in countries around the world, featuring concerts and water education activities aimed at igniting a tipping point to help solve the water crisis. Jessica Biel, Alexandra Cousteau, Pete Wentz, Angélique Kidjo and Jenny Fletcher were due to lend their names and their time in support.

Controversy
Before and after the event there was concern over the sponsorship of the Run For Water by Dow Chemical, whose sponsorship of this event has been described as "the ultimate in greenwashing", given Dow's ownership of Union Carbide, their refusal to clean up the Bhopal site, plus their direct responsibility for groundwater poisoning incidents in Morrisonville, Louisiana and the Tittabawassee River in Michigan. Their much-publicised water filtration plants in India have failed because the local population cannot afford to replace the expensive high-tech filters.

Host cities
The Dow Live Earth Run for Water was hosted by about 200 cities around the world, including: Amsterdam, Atlanta, Brussels, Buenos Aires, Cairo, Cape Town, Chicago, Chongqing, Copenhagen, Hong Kong, Istanbul, Jakarta, Jerusalem, Jimbaran, Karachi, Lima, Lisbon, Los Angeles, Manila, Melbourne, Mexico City, Minneapolis, Monterrey, Montreal, New York City, Rio de Janeiro, São Paulo, San Diego, Santiago, Santo Domingo, Seattle, Singapore City, Sydney, Toronto, Vancouver and Washington, D.C.

Live performances
Many of the cities featured live entertainment following the 6K run/walk. Artists include Melissa Etheridge in Los Angeles with The Roots; special guest John Legend in Brooklyn's Prospect Park; Rob Thomas in Atlanta; Collective Soul with special guest Sam Moore in Chicago; Kany García in Mexico City; Kevin Johansen and The Nada in Buenos Aires; and Slank in Bali.

Cancellations and protests
Demonstrations against the run had been planned by the International Campaign for Justice in Bhopal.

The Dow sponsorship of the Run For Water was protested by organizations representing the victims of the Bhopal tragedy, supported by Amnesty International. Planned events were also cancelled in Milan.

In New Delhi, the event was protested by a group of activists who disguised their involvement by creating a fictitious front organization, the Hindustan Sea Turtle Alliance, to register their event with Live Earth.

Beneficiaries
All donations raised by the Dow Live Earth Run for Water will be disseminated to fund sustainable and scalable water programs. A growing global network of NGO partners including Global Water Challenge, A Child's Right, Akvo, Fondo Para La Paz, Indonesia Water Partnership, Lien Aid, Pump Aid, Wildlands Conservation Trust, and many others.

See also

List of historic rock festivals
 An Inconvenient Truth 
 Climate change
 Earth Hour
 Global warming
 Hurricane Katrina
 Individual and political action on climate change
 Politics of global warming
 Save Our Selves
 Denmark plants trees

References

External links

 Official Live Earth website
 Live Earth video site

 
2007 in music
2008 in music
2010 in music
Benefit concerts
Musical advocacy groups
International environmental organizations
Music festivals established in 2010
Music festivals established in 2007
2007 in the environment
July 2007 events